Tetracha huberi is a species of tiger beetle that was described by Johnson in 1991.

References

Cicindelidae
Beetles described in 1991